Widnes railway station (formerly Widnes North) is a railway station serving the town of Widnes, Halton, England. It is recorded in the National Heritage List for England as a designated Grade II listed building.  The station is operated by Northern Trains.

History

The station is located where the line is bridged by Birchfield Road, now the B5419. The main station building is of the "common twin-pavilion type adopted by the CLC" with a larger, two-storey, projecting pavilion forming a house and a smaller single-storey one. Linking them is an entrance hall, ticket office and three-bay iron-arcaded waiting shelter. The building is decorated with elaborately fretted bargeboards. The station was equipped with a carved stone drinking fountain. Opposite the main building was a matching waiting shelter, this was replaced sometime after 1961 with a steel and glass type shelter.

It had two platforms, both accessed by steps down from the road overbridge on either side of two running lines, the platforms had sidings at their back the one to the north was equipped with a cattle pen. There was a goods yard and shed to the north of the lines and west of the station. The goods yard was able to accommodate most types of goods, it was equipped with a five-ton crane. 

In about 1914/15 the station was renamed Farnworth for Appleton and then Farnworth (Widnes) around 1938/39. The station was renamed Widnes North on 5 January 1959 , the former LN&WR station becoming  at this time and finally Widnes on 6 May 1968 after  and Widnes South had closed.

The station closed to goods traffic on 6 July 1964 and the goods yard demolished.

"Homeward Bound" by Paul Simon

Widnes railway station is generally believed to be the station where Paul Simon reputedly composed the song "Homeward Bound" though some think it more likely that it was Ditton railway station, in order to get to London by train. Simon is quoted as saying "[i]f you'd ever seen Widnes, then you'd know why I was keen to get back to London as quickly as possible." However, rather than actually being 'homeward bound' (Simon temporarily lived in London at the time), Simon was on tour and had just performed at local DJ Geoff Speed's Howff Folk Club in Widnes and was reportedly dropped off at Widnes station by Speed. Simon was not headed for London but for Humberside and Widnes station would have been the logical choice of station to travel there.

Facilities
A footbridge now connects the two platforms. The station is staffed, but only until early afternoon. There is a car park outside. The station was refurbished in 2009 and as of 2010 houses a station shop and a beauty parlour, though there are still no toilet or waiting facilities for passengers other than the already existent shelter on the Manchester-bound platform. The platforms and footbridge have recently been refurbished. A ticket machine has been installed on both platforms.  Digital display screens and automated announcements provide train running information.

The ticket office is staffed on a part-time basis between the hours of 07:00 and 14:25 Mon-Sat.  Step free access is available to both platforms.

Services
There are generally two local trains (operated by Northern Trains) per hour in each direction, to Manchester Oxford Road to the east and Liverpool Lime Street to the west. Journey times from Widnes to Manchester on these local trains are around 45–50 minutes, depending on the number of stops. Journey time to Liverpool is around 25–30 minutes, again depending on stops.

An express service also operates hourly in each direction (run by East Midlands Railway), continuing beyond Manchester Piccadilly towards ,  and Norwich. The journey time on most of these trains to Manchester is 30 minutes, whilst Liverpool can be reached in 18 minutes.

Until the May 2018 timetable change Widnes was also served by one service to Scarborough on Mondays to Saturdays (run by TransPennine Express). All TransPennine services now operate via Newton-Le-Willows.

The typical off-peak service is:

Northern

 2tph to Manchester Oxford Road
 2tph to Liverpool Lime Street

East Midlands

 1tph to Norwich via Manchester Piccadilly, Sheffield, Nottingham
 1tph to Liverpool Lime Street

See also

Listed buildings in Widnes

References

Notes

Citations

Bibliography

External links

Grade II listed railway stations
Grade II listed buildings in Cheshire
Railway stations in the Borough of Halton
DfT Category E stations
Former Cheshire Lines Committee stations
Railway stations in Great Britain opened in 1873
Railway stations served by East Midlands Railway
Northern franchise railway stations
Buildings and structures in Widnes